"Elegy" is episode 20 of the American television anthology series The Twilight Zone. It originally aired on February 19, 1960 on CBS.

Opening narration

Plot
In September 2185, while on a routine geological mission, astronauts Meyers, Webber, and Kirby land their spaceship on a remote asteroid 655 million miles away from Earth after running low on fuel. They find that the atmosphere and gravity are identical to Earth's. Opening the hatch to the spaceship, they find they have landed near a farm. They initially think they have traveled back in time, due to the old tractor they find, although they notice that there are two suns in the sky. They find a farmer gazing off into the distance and try to get his attention, but realize he is just a statue.

They hear band music in the distance, and follow it to a town to find the music is being played on a speaker; the band is also just statues. The astronauts are disturbed by their surroundings as everything and everyone is eerily motionless. They hypothesize that time may pass at a different rate, but a nearby grandfather clock without hands leads them to believe that time passes normally and that there is some other reason for everyone's motionlessness. They are further confused as the statues appear to feel like flesh, or something similar to it. They decide they split up to explore it. One astronaut finds an odd beauty contest where an unattractive woman has been crowned the winner. After the astronaut departs, a man in the audience turns and smiles.

Converging on the center of town, they are startled to find someone who does move: "Jeremy Wickwire", the caretaker of this place. He is told by the men that a nuclear war destroyed much of the Earth in 1985, and that it has taken two hundred years to recover from it. Wickwire explains to the astronauts that the asteroid they have landed on is an exclusive cemetery called "Happy Glades", founded in 1973, where rich people can live out their life's greatest fantasy after they die. The town is one of many areas where people may be placed; others include the Roman era, the Egpytian era, and the Wild West. This town is the most popular because it represents a time in American culture where creature comforts were most abundant.

Wickwire serves the three men wine and asks each man what his greatest wish is. All three reply that they wish they were on their ship heading for home. Wickwire misunderstood who the astronauts were, thinking they were from the Happy Glades organization. He explains the reason Happy Glades exists is because it's not possible to have peace on Earth. Wickwire (who explains that he is a robot that has been deactivated for "about 200 years" and only turns on for occasional duties) apologizes to them, and explains that it is his job to ensure peace and tranquility at "Happy Glades". Suddenly, they realize that their drinks have been poisoned with what Wickwire refers to as "eternifying fluid". As the men are dying, the astronaut pleads for an antidote, and that they mean no harm. Wickwire responds that they "are men, and while there are men, there can be no peace."

Later, Wickwire re-installs the embalmed astronauts in their ship, posing them at their posts as if they were on their way home.

Closing narration

Episode notes
Inside the spaceship, "equipment" originally constructed for the film Forbidden Planet was reused for this episode, and shows up in a number of other Twilight Zone episodes. The sound effects heard inside the spaceship will be used again six years later as some of the sounds on the bridge of the starship USS Enterprise, in the original Star Trek television series. The song played in the scene with the frozen marching band is "Hot Time" by the University of Wisconsin’s marching band. The set of the room of the frozen mayor addressing the crowd had been used in the previous episodes "The Sixteen-Millimeter Shrine" as part of Barbara Trenton's home, as well as in "The Purple Testament" as the lobby of an Army hospital. It would be used again as a hallway of a college campus in "Long Live Walter Jameson".

Further reading
DeVoe, Bill. (2008). Trivia from The Twilight Zone. Albany, GA: Bear Manor Media. 
Grams, Martin. (2008). The Twilight Zone: Unlocking the Door to a Television Classic. Churchville, MD: OTR Publishing. 
Zicree, Marc Scott (2018) The Twilight Zone Companion 3rd Expanded and Revised ed. Silman-James Press

External links
 
 Text of original short story

Television episodes about death
The Twilight Zone (1959 TV series season 1) episodes
1960 American television episodes
Fiction set in 1973
Fiction set in 1985
Fiction set in the 22nd century
Television episodes about nuclear war and weapons
Television shows written by Charles Beaumont
Works about astronauts
Television episodes directed by Douglas Heyes